The Orme School is a private boarding and day college preparatory school for grades 8 through 12 in Mayer, Arizona, United States. It is located along Ash Creek and surrounded by public land and an operating cattle ranch. Its symbol is the "Quarter Circle V Bar", a name once used for the school and cattle ranch.

History
In 1929, Charles H. Orme, Sr. and Minna Vrang Orme (inducted into the Arizona Women's Hall of Fame in 1989) left their dairy farm in Phoenix and bought a ranch in the high grassland of central Arizona. Both graduates of Stanford University, the Ormes believed in the necessity of a good education. To educate their three children and those of the ranch employees, they opened a one-room school in an old ranch house that year.  That same ranch house, called "Old Adobe", continues to stand on the school grounds and is still in use as an English classroom.

The school expanded and facilities were added and improved.  Charles H. Orme, Jr. became the school's first headmaster in 1945; he accelerated the growth of the institution when he decided to make the school a college preparatory boarding school. In 1962, the school was incorporated as a not-for-profit institution governed by a board of trustees. Mr. Bruce A. Sanborn is now the school's 10th headmaster.

The school's symbol is the historic brand of the Orme Ranch, which surrounds the school on three sides.  Called the "Quarter Circle V Bar", it has been the brand of the ranch and the symbol of the school since their founding.  It is a registered brand with the State of Arizona's Department of Agriculture. The students and staff of the school participated in two annual roundups of the cattle on the 40,000 acres of the greater ranch property, wherein students would assist the ranch hands with the normal business of cattle management, including branding.  The roundups would be followed by a fall and spring rodeo wherein the students would compete in calf roping, barrel racing, and other rodeo events staged for parents and guests of the school.  Originally all students were required to learn horsemanship and participate in the two yearly roundups.  These programs and the strong connection between the ranch and the school has largely ended by the 1980s.

In 1969, the school began The Orme Fine Arts Festival under the direction of teacher Dorothy Swain Lewis who had arrived at the school in 1952, a program which has been a part of the Orme curriculum to the present day, and has brought many nationally recognized artists and musicians to the school program for over 50 years.  The 50th anniversary of the festival was celebrated in 2018 and continues to be an important part of the school calendar.

In 1987, the school experienced an on-campus shooting incident. After being caught drinking and facing suspension, a student went on a shooting spree, wounding several teachers with a shotgun and another teacher with a pistol which was owned by the school. Later, the student was confronted by police officers while still on campus. After dropping the shotgun, he drew his sidearm and pointed it at police, at which point the officers fired, killing the student.

Campus
The campus consists of the Phillips Library, the Willits Gymnasium, Student Commons, Founders' Dining Hall, the Old Main Administration Building, Welcome Center, Buck Hart Horsecollar Theater, Morton Vrang Orme Memorial Chapel, Lecture Hall, Burns Health Center, Mosher Math and Science Center, and seventeen residence halls.

Classrooms include a planetarium, smart classroom, four science labs, a greenhouse, a photography darkroom, a computer center, four art studios, and a music room. There are currently 130 students enrolled for the 2017–2018 school year.

Athletic facilities include the Willits Gymnasium, a lighted football field, baseball, softball, and soccer fields, five tennis courts, paintball arena, fitness center, and an outdoor swimming pool. The school's extensive equestrian facilities include a lighted rodeo arena with stock chutes, an English equestrian arena, 15 fenced grazing pastures, 25 private stalls in the "Mare Motel", 2 round pens, a modern tack room, and 26,000 acres of wilderness riding trails.

Athletics

Orme School team sports include football, volleyball, cross country, basketball (girls' and boys'), softball, baseball, soccer, and track and field.

The school's athletic programs have been within the Arizona Independent Athletic Association of independent and private schools and later in the Arizona Interscholastic Association. The boys' football team won the CAA State Championship in the fall of 2013. The boys' basketball team went undefeated and won the AIA 1A state title in 2011, with a starting lineup composed of all international players. The use of international players at Orme and at Westwind Preparatory Academy, another basketball school that won a state title in 2011, resulted in the AIA deciding to change its rules about those students. In response, Orme left the AIA and joined the Canyon Athletic Association (AZCAA).

References

Private high schools in Arizona
Private middle schools in Arizona
Schools in Yavapai County, Arizona
Preparatory schools in Arizona
Educational institutions established in 1929
1929 establishments in Arizona